Lenino is a rural locality (a selo) and the administrative center of Tabun-Aralsky Selsoviet of Yenotayevsky District, Astrakhan Oblast, Russia. The population was 895 as of 2010. There are 7 streets.

Geography 
Lenino is located 42 km southeast of Yenotayevka (the district's administrative centre) by road. Tabun-Aral is the nearest rural locality.

References 

Rural localities in Yenotayevsky District